Hari Charan Soy (19 December 1922 – 7 October 1999) was an Indian politician. He was a Member of Parliament, representing Singhbhum, Bihar in the Lok Sabha the lower house of India's Parliament as a member of the Jharkhand Party. Soy died in Bihar on 7 October 1999, at the age of 76.

References

External links
  Official biographical sketch in Parliament of India website

1922 births
1999 deaths
India MPs 1962–1967
Jharkhand Party politicians
Lok Sabha members from Bihar